Spencer State Forest is a Massachusetts state forest and recreation reserve located in the town of Spencer, managed by the Massachusetts Department of Conservation and Recreation. The 92 mile (148 km) Midstate Trail passes through the state forest. The Commonwealth of Massachusetts also conducts logging in some parts of the property.

Geography
Spencer State Forest is divided among three non-contiguous parcels. The most notable of these, located in south Spencer, is the Howe Pond parcel, an estate formerly belonging to Elias Howe, the inventor of the sewing machine.
The Howe family of Spencer did much to make the town famous in the annals of ingenious Americans. William Howe of Spencer developed a wooden truss bridge named for him, his brother, Tyler Howe, patented a spring bed. Their nephew, Elias Howe, Jr., may well have eclipsed them when he invented the lockstitch sewing machine. The Howe Pond parcel (historically referred to as Howe State Park) includes a mill pond and dam constructed by the inventor. Swimming, once permitted is not currently permitted in the pond; lifeguards are no longer present in season due to State DCR cutbacks. The Howe Pond parcel also includes picnic tables and outdoor grills. The public restrooms have been shuttered for a decade. It is located off Massachusetts Route 31 via Howe Pond Road.  

Spencer State Forest Trails
The 92 mile Mid-State Trail is the longest trail marked by yellow triangles and extends from Douglas State Forest at the Massachusetts/Rhode Island border in the south to New Hampshire. In Spencer, it enters from Charlton via Four Chimneys Wildlife Area on Borkum Road traversing Spencer State Forest sections on East Charlton Road, Ash Street, then leads off-street through both private lands and the forest to R Jones Road where it crosses a primitive parking lot continuing on through Spencer's newly designated Sibley/Warner Farm conservation lands through to Route 9 near the Spencer/Leicester Line.

The Mid-State Trail ties Spencer State Forest parcels, Moose Hill and Buck Hill Wildlife Management areas, Sugden Reservoir, Thompson and Browning Ponds, Camp Marshall 4H Camp, Treasure Valley Boy Scout reservation, Sampson's Pebble geological feature and leads into the town of Oakham. In Spencer, Mid-State trail parking is roadside at East Charlton and I Capen Roads and in the Buck Hill areas.

The trail north of Route 9 through Moose Hill Wildlife Management Area crosses picturesque Moose Hill levy pond created in the 1960s for flood control. Ski enthusiast/historians will note the former 1960s era Moose Hill Ski area referenced which ferried skiers on a hay wagon, truck bed and primitive rope tow up to the top of Moose Hill above the levy area.

The upper section of Spencer State Forest is in northern Spencer, in the area of Turkey Hill Brook. 
A primitive lean-to for overnight campers is located on the property atop the 1,014 foot (309 m) drumlin Buck Hill. A parking lot is located off McCormick Road in Spencer.

Areas comprising the Spencer State Forest and adjacent Wildlife Management Areas (WMA), Howe and Browning Ponds, Sugden Reservoir and the following entwined brooks present an outstanding array of water resources for serene intimate aquatic aficionado's enjoyment.

Turkey Hill Brook flows from Paxton to Spencer in the northeast corner of town. "Dams were erected along the brook to power the wire mills that dotted this area, but the only remaining dam is the one that forms Thompson Pond. The brook joins the Seven Mile River northeast of Pine Grove Cemetery.

The Seven Mile River originates in Rutland and was dammed to form Browning Pond. It merges with Turkey Hill Brook and connects to the Quaboag River in East Brookfield. Seven miles from Brookfield, the river served as a landmark when Brookfield was the only settlement between Worcester and the Connecticut Valley.

Cranberry River flows from Charlton and was dammed to form Cranberry Meadow Pond in the southeast corner of town and dammed again to form Howe Pond at Howe State Park, joining the Seven Mile River near Route 9.

The overall geography includes hilly terrain, creeks, wetlands, and transitional oak-hickory to northern hardwood forest types.

The Depot Trail, Spencer's rail trail is a 2 ½‐mile walking trail along an abandoned railroad bed running from South Spencer Road to Chestnut Street, and connects into Spencer State Forest trails. There is lower section of Howe Pond with benches, fishing and portaged watercraft launching. Trail parking is adjacent to the railroad overpass parking on South Spencer Road.

The Spencer Snowbirds Snowmobile Club, a private organization formed in 1972, maintains a network of snowmobile trails throughout the town, crossing both public and private property. Trail riding permits, membership and landowner memberships are detailed at http://www.spencersnowbirds.com

Howe State Park originated as part of the Civilian Conservation Corps (CCC) legacy formed in 1933's height of the Great Depression, when newly inaugurated President Franklin D. Roosevelt’s first New Deal initiatives established the Emergency Conservation Work Act (ECW), popularly known as the Civilian Conservation Corps (CCC) and/or "Roosevelt's Tree Army."
Both an economic relief and conservation program, CCC provided jobs for unemployed young men and veterans to support their families, while focusing on improving the nation’s open space and recreational resources. The CCC program in Massachusetts (1933-1942), was concerned with improvement and development of state park resources. Approximately 68 camps enrolled nearly 100,000 men. The CCC touched both the lives of these enrollees and their families and left a lasting legacy of state forest improvements and recreational resources still evident today.

Massachusetts State Parks system was in its infancy when the CCC was established in 1933. Now, more than seventy-five years later, the work of the CCC still forms the cornerstones of the system as we know it today.   
Spencer State Forest, as many others, emerged from cut-over lands acquired for less than $5 per acre and largely inaccessible areas due to lack of roads and recreational facilities into being Spencer's community resource with beach, roads, trails, ponds, forest plantations and recreational facilities built by the CCC, and found in every region of the state. Currently the Howe Park area is mothballed.

References

External links
Spencer State Forest Department of Conservation and Recreation
Spencer State Forest Trail Map Department of Conservation and Recreation

State parks of Massachusetts
Massachusetts natural resources
Massachusetts state forests
Parks in Worcester County, Massachusetts
Spencer, Massachusetts
Protected areas established in 1922
1922 establishments in Massachusetts